Violet Lloyd may refer to:
 Vi Lloyd, Australian politician
 Violet Lloyd (actress), English actress, singer and music hall performer